The 1926–27 Gold Cup was the 15th edition of the Gold Cup, a cup competition in Northern Irish football.

The tournament was won by Linfield for the seventh time, defeating Glenavon 1–0 in the final at Celtic Park.

Results

First round

|}

Quarter-finals

|}

Semi-finals

|}

Final

References

1926–27 in Northern Ireland association football